NCU may refer to:

Businesses and organizations
National Cleanup Day, a cleanup event held annually on the Third Saturday in September 
National Cyclists' Union, a former association for bicycle racing in Great Britain
Northern Cricket Union of Ireland

Education
Nagoya City University, Japan
Nanchang University in Jiangxi, China
former name of Nanjing University in Nanjing, China
National Central University in Jhongli, Taiwan
Nicolaus Copernicus University in Toruń, Poland
The NorthCap University, in Gurgaon, Haryana, India
North Central University in Minneapolis, Minnesota
Northcentral University in Prescott, Arizona
Northwest Christian University in Eugene, Oregon
Northern Caribbean University in Mandeville, Jamaica

Other
National Currency Unit used in OECD statistics
Nukus Airport (Uzbekistan), IATA code